Javed Zaman (born 8 August 1976) is an Indian first-class cricketer from Assam who played for Assam and Railways. He made his debut for Assam in 1993/94 Ranji season. He is a right-handed batsman and right-arm medium pace bowler. Zaman appeared in 47 first class matches and took 122 wickets at an average of 30.07 and economy of 2.83 with a best of 7/87 in an innings. He was one of Assam's greatest fast bowlers.

References

1976 births
Living people
Indian cricketers
Assam cricketers
People from Dhubri district
Cricketers from Assam